Befunolol (INN) is a beta blocker with intrinsic sympathomimetic activity used in the management of open-angle glaucoma. It also acts as a β adrenoreceptor partial agonist. Befunolol was introduced in Japan in 1983 by Kakenyaku Kako Co. under the trade name Bentos.

References

Benzofuran ethers at the benzene ring
Beta blockers
Catechol ethers
N-isopropyl-phenoxypropanolamines
Ophthalmology drugs